Cryptolechia robusta is a moth in the family Depressariidae. It was described by Wang in 2006. It is found in Hubei, China.

The length of the forewings is 16–17 mm. The forewings are pale yellow, with scattered brown scales and a small brown dot at the middle of the cell. The first brown fascia runs from the costal three-fifths to the tornus and the second brown fascia extends from the apex to the tornus and is joined with the first fascia, forming a V-shaped pattern. The hindwings are pale grey. The hindwings are black.

Etymology
The species name refers to the aedeagus and is derived from Latin robustus (meaning stout).

References

Moths described in 2006
Cryptolechia (moth)